Doncaster Metropolitan Borough Council is the local authority for Doncaster in South Yorkshire, England. The council is elected every four years. Since 2002 the council has been led by a directly elected mayor.

From 1973 to 2014, the council was elected by thirds every year except the year in which county council elections took place in other parts of England. In 2015, the whole council was elected due to boundary changes to the wards and it was decided that the whole council would be elected every four years in future from 2017, so that the council elections would coincide with the election of the Mayor of Doncaster in future.

Political control
From 1927 to 1974 Doncaster was a county borough, independent of any county council. Under the Local Government Act 1972 it had its territory enlarged and became a metropolitan borough, with South Yorkshire County Council providing county-level services. The first election to the reconstituted borough council was held in 1973, initially operating as a shadow authority before coming into its revised powers on 1 April 1974. South Yorkshire County Council was abolished in 1986 and Doncaster became a unitary authority. Political control of the council since 1973 has been held by the following parties:

Leadership

Prior to 2002, political leadership was provided by the leader of the council. Since 2002, political leadership has been provided instead by a directly elected Mayor of Doncaster. The council separately appoints a civic mayor each year, who is largely ceremonial. The directly elected mayors since 2002 have been:

Council elections
1998 Doncaster Metropolitan Borough Council election
1999 Doncaster Metropolitan Borough Council election
2000 Doncaster Metropolitan Borough Council election
2002 Doncaster Metropolitan Borough Council election
2003 Doncaster Metropolitan Borough Council election
2004 Doncaster Metropolitan Borough Council election (whole council elected after boundary changes)
2006 Doncaster Metropolitan Borough Council election
2007 Doncaster Metropolitan Borough Council election
2008 Doncaster Metropolitan Borough Council election
2010 Doncaster Metropolitan Borough Council election
2011 Doncaster Metropolitan Borough Council election
2012 Doncaster Metropolitan Borough Council election
2014 Doncaster Metropolitan Borough Council election
2015 Doncaster Metropolitan Borough Council election (boundary changes)
2017 Doncaster Metropolitan Borough Council election
2021 Doncaster Metropolitan Borough Council election

By-election results

1998–2003

2003–2010

2010–2015

2015–2020

2020–2025

References

By-election results

External links
Doncaster Metropolitan Borough Council

 
Politics of Doncaster
Council elections in South Yorkshire
Metropolitan borough council elections in England